Lejota is a genus of syrphid flies in the family Syrphidae.

Species
L. aerea (Loew, 1872)
L. cyanea (Smith, 1912)
L. femoralis (Shiraki, 1968)
L. femorata Violovitsh, 1980
L. korsakovi (Stackelberg, 1952)
L. ruficornis (Wahlberg, 1843)
L. simplex (Shiraki, 1968)
L. villosa Violovitsh, 1982

References

Eristalinae
Diptera of North America
Hoverfly genera
Taxa named by Camillo Rondani